The 2000 CAF Cup was the 9th edition of the CAF Cup, the African continental club competition for runners up of the respective domestic leagues. It was won by Algerian team JS Kabylie who beat Ismaily SC of Egypt on the away goals rule in the final, after they finished level on aggregate 1-1.

Preliminary round

|}

First round

|}
1 AC Semassi, Aslad Moundou and Saint Anthony's withdrew before first leg

Second round

|}
1 Hay El Arab withdrew after 1st leg

Quarter-finals

|}

Semi-finals

|}

Ismaily won 7-0 on aggregate and advanced to the final.

JS Kabylie won 2-1 on aggregate and advanced to the final.

Finals

|}

First Leg

Second Leg

1-1 on aggregate, JS Kabylie won on away goals rule

Champions

See also
2000 CAF Champions League
CAF Cup

External links
Results at RSSSF.com
Results at SportScheduler

2000
3
3